Arnaud Clément and Sébastien Grosjean were the defending champions, but did not partner together this year.  Clément partnered Jaroslav Levinský, losing in the first round.  Grosjean partnered Gaël Monfils, losing in the second round.

Mark Knowles and Daniel Nestor won the title, defeating Wayne Arthurs and Paul Hanley 7–6(8–6), 7–6(7–2) in the final.

Seeds

Draw

Finals

Top half

Bottom half

References
Draw

Doubles men
2005 ATP Tour